Marsupostrongylus longilarvatus is a metastrongyl (lung-worm) found in various marsupials. It was described as new to science by D.M. Spratt in 1979 from a swamp wallaby in New South Wales.

References 

Nematodes described in 1979
Rhabditida
Parasitic nematodes of mammals
Parasites of marsupials